Brugmansia sanguinea, the red angel's trumpet, is a species of South American flowering shrub or small tree belonging to the genus Brugmansia in tribe Datureae of subfamily Solanoideae of the nightshade family Solanaceae. It has been cultivated and used as an entheogen for shamanic purposes by the South American Natives for centuries - possibly even millennia.

Description
The  pendent, tubular/trumpet-shaped flowers come in shades of brilliant red, yellow, orange and green.

Distribution

Toxicity

All parts of Brugmansia sanguinea are poisonous. Different parts of the plant contain tropane alkaloids in varying proportions. Alkaloid content in the flowers is mainly atropine with only traces of scopolamine (hyoscine). The seeds of B. sanguinea contain approximately 0.17% alkaloids by mass, of which 78% are scopolomine.

Gallery

References

sanguinea
Flora of Bolivia
Flora of Colombia
Flora of Peru